Album of the Year is an album by drummer Art Blakey and the Jazz Messengers recorded in 1981 in Paris and released on the Dutch Timeless label. 
A 2015 re-issue on the Japanese "Solid Records" label offers two additional tracks recorded in 1982 (and previously released on Oh-By the Way) with a different line up including Terrence Blanchard, Donald Harrison and Johnny O'Neal.

Reception

Scott Yanow of Allmusic states that "The 1981 edition of The Jazz Messengers featured more than its share of young greats, reinforcing drummer Art Blakey's recognition as jazz's greatest talent scout. This high-quality set, recorded in Paris, includes new material".

Track listing 
 "Cheryl" (Charlie Parker) - 5:23   
 "Ms. B.C." (Pamela Watson) - 6:47   
 "In Case You Missed It" (Robert Watson) - 8:53   
 "Little Man" (Charles Fambrough) - 7:19   
 "Witch Hunt" (Wayne Shorter) - 6:26   
 "The Soulful Mr. Timmons" (James Williams) - 7:46

Personnel 
Art Blakey - drums
Wynton Marsalis - trumpet
Robert Watson - alto saxophone
Bill Pierce - tenor saxophone
James Williams - piano
Charles Fambrough - bass

References 

Art Blakey albums
The Jazz Messengers albums
1981 albums
Timeless Records albums